John Laurence Miller (born April 29, 1947) is an American former professional golfer. He was one of the top players in the world during the mid-1970s. He was the first to shoot 63 in a major championship to win the 1973 U.S. Open, and he ranked second in the world on Mark McCormack's world golf rankings in both 1974 and 1975 behind Jack Nicklaus. Miller won 25 PGA Tour events, including two majors. He was inducted into the World Golf Hall of Fame in 1998. He was the lead golf analyst for NBC Sports, a position he held from January 1990 to February 2019. He is also an active golf course architect.

Early years and education
Born and raised in San Francisco, California, Miller was invited to join the Olympic Club in 1963 as a Junior Golf Section member, and became the top player on its junior team. He won the San Francisco city junior title in 1963 at age 16, and the following year won the 1964 U.S. Junior Amateur. After graduation from Abraham Lincoln High School in 1965, he enrolled at Brigham Young University in Provo, Utah.

In the spring of his freshman year of college, Miller qualified for the 1966 U.S. Open at the Olympic Club. His intimate knowledge of his home course helped him to finish in a tie for eighth place, the low amateur by three strokes, and earned him an invitation to the 1967 Masters. He won the California State Amateur Championship in 1968.

Miller was an All-American at BYU and graduated in 1969 with a degree in physical education.

PGA Tour
Miller joined the PGA Tour in 1969 at age 22, and won his first tour event in 1971. He made a double eagle on the fifth hole at Muirfield during the second round of the 1972 Open Championship. During his professional career, Miller won two major titles: the 1973 U.S. Open and the 1976 Open Championship.

1973 U.S. Open
Coming into the U.S. Open at the challenging par-71 Oakmont, Miller was a 26-year-old with just two tour victories in four years, but had done well in several majors. He tied for second at the 1971 Masters, and had top-10 finishes at the U.S. Open in 1971 and 1972. Miller had yet to win in 1973, but by mid-June, he had recorded eight top-10 finishes, which included a tie for 6th at the Masters.

Miller played the first two rounds at Oakmont (near Pittsburgh) with Arnold Palmer and his "Army" gallery, at its largest in Palmer's native western Pennsylvania. Miller was two under par (140) after the second round but shot a five-over 76 on Saturday to settle at three-over (216) for the championship. Miller played the front nine without his yardage book on Saturday until his wife Linda retrieved it.

Miller began the fourth and final round in 12th place, six shots behind the four co-leaders, including Palmer. Teeing off at 1:36 pm, about an hour ahead of the final group, Miller shot a scorching eight-under 63, considered one of the most remarkable rounds in major championship history. He passed the leading players of the day, including future hall-of-famers Jack Nicklaus, Gary Player, Lee Trevino, and Palmer, who was in the final pairing with John Schlee. Miller's 63 was the lowest round to win a major championship until it was tied by Henrik Stenson at the Open Championship in 2016.

Miller birdied the first four holes and hit all 18 greens in regulation. He got five more birdies with only one bogey (a 3-putt on the 244 yard par-3 #8), and needed only 29 putts during the round. Ten of his approach shots finished within 10 feet of the cup. In 2007, Miller said: "It was the greatest ball-striking round I've ever seen and I've been around a little bit."

Miller wound up at 5-under (279) for the championship, beating the runner-up Schlee by a single stroke, who shot a 1-under 70. Only six players, Miller included, shot under par in the final round. Miller earned $35,000 for the victory.

After Oakmont
Miller followed that triumph at Oakmont by finishing in a tie for second at the next major, The Open Championship at Royal Troon a month later, three strokes behind winner Tom Weiskopf.

This was the first of five consecutive top-10 finishes for Miller at The Open. In 1974, Miller was the leading money winner on the PGA Tour with eight victories, which considerably outpaced the rest of the field. He amassed a then-record $353,201 (not exceeded until 1978), and unseated Nicklaus as the Tour's leading money winner for a season.

Miller began 1975 with three more victories, winning two of them in remarkable fashion. He won the Phoenix Open by 14 strokes, which included a second-round 61 for a 24-under par cumulative score of 260, the lowest on the tour in 20 years. He also won the Tucson Open by nine strokes, with a final round 61.

Miller later said of his peak period in the mid-1970s: "When I won at Tucson by nine shots in 1975, I would say the average iron shot I hit that week was no more than two feet off line. It was unbelievable. When I was at my peak, I would go into streaks where I felt that I could knock down the pin from anywhere with my irons. I played some golf that I think is unequaled."

Miller finished second to Jack Nicklaus at the 1975 Masters, and third at The Open Championship later in the year at Carnoustie, just a single stroke from playoffs in both. He won his second and final major in 1976, a six stroke victory over Nicklaus and a 19-year-old Seve Ballesteros at The Open Championship at Royal Birkdale. The course had played hard and fast after scorching hot conditions in England that summer, during the 1976 United Kingdom heat wave, which saw record hot temperatures and several minor fires breaking out in the tournament. Miller's final round of 66 at Royal Birkdale tied the course record.

Following his 1976 Open Championship win, Miller, never known as an outstanding putter, lost the form that made him a frequent winner in his early career and failed to win for the next three years, due to a putting affliction widely known as the "yips".

Miller later said that he considered quitting professional golf during his slump in form between 1977 and 1979, but a passage in the Scriptures, "It's not what you accomplish in life, but what you overcome", helped inspire him to continue playing golf. Miller also said that Jack Nicklaus, whom he viewed as a father figure, was "amazingly supportive" of him during his bleak period in the late 1970s.

In 1980, Miller notched his first win in almost four years, the Jackie Gleason-Inverrary Classic.

In 1981, Miller enjoyed one final spectacular season. His victory at the Million Dollar Challenge in Sun City, South Africa following an epic 9-hole sudden-death playoff with Seve Ballesteros  made him that year's leading worldwide money-winner after two earlier wins in the United States. Miller's return to impressive form in 1981 resulted in him competing in his second Ryder Cup. To date, the 1981 Ryder Cup at Walton Heath Golf Club in England remains the heaviest defeat that a European team has suffered at the hands of the United States and it is considered by many to be the finest American team ever assembled.

Miller finished his career with 25 PGA Tour wins and 105 top-10 finishes. Miller finished runner-up three times at The Masters in 1971, 1975 and 1981. The only major championship Miller failed to have a top-3 finish in is the PGA Championship. He played on two Ryder Cup teams, 1975 and 1981. He was inducted into the World Golf Hall of Fame in 1998.

In 2012, Fred Couples described Miller as "probably the best ball-striker ever".

Subsequent career
Although Miller became eligible for the Senior PGA Tour in 1997, he decided to forgo regular play on the senior tour in part due to the strain the sport puts on the knees of a player.  Instead, he has focused on his role as lead golf analyst for NBC Sports' limited golf schedule and other business ventures. This was despite his victory in the 1994 AT&T Pebble Beach National Pro-Am, at age 46, after he had semi-retired in 1990 to take up broadcasting.

As a commentator, Miller became known for his straightforward and sometimes blunt remarks, which sometimes earned him the enmity of players. One example came on June 16, 2008, when he referred to Rocco Mediate during the broadcast of the U.S. Open's 18-hole playoff as "looking like the guy who cleans Tiger Woods' pool." Miller said that "guys with the name of Rocco don't get on the trophy, do they?" Mediate, who has battled many physical problems throughout his career, nevertheless played superbly, and took the heavily favored Woods to an 18-hole playoff (and one extra sudden-death hole) before losing. Mediate later laughed off the remarks and Miller later apologized for his comments, saying: "I chose my words poorly and in the future will be more careful." He added that his intention was to "convey my affection and admiration for Rocco's everyman qualities and had absolutely nothing to do with his heritage."

In 2012, Miller revealed that Tiger Woods once asked him to be his coach. Woods asked if Miller would give him lessons after Jack Nicklaus had told Woods that Miller was "the best short iron player ever". Miller said that he declined the offer from Woods because of his commitment to NBC Sports and a desire to spend time with his children and grandchildren.

Miller has written a column for Golf Digest magazine for several years, offering insight into various aspects of golf, often featuring the professional game. He also wrote the book I Call The Shots, a look at the PGA Tour's personalities during his peak years, the Tour's current stars, as well as broadcasting insights. Known for his very weak grip, with both "Vs" formed by the forefinger and thumb of each hand pointing to his chin, he sought to eliminate the left side of the golf course as an area for missed shots.

An offshoot to his broadcasting career has been a string of movie and TV appearances as himself in the role of "beloved golf great". In one movie, The Associate, with Whoopi Goldberg, an aging billionaire is willing to transfer management of all his assets in exchange for the opportunity to play a round of golf with Johnny Miller.

Miller is a partner in a limited partnership which purchased Silverado Country Club in Napa, California on July 1, 2010. He also owns a golf design company and a golf academy and designed the Thanksgiving Point Golf Course in Lehi, Utah, host of the Champion's Challenge. Although Miller has helped design 34 golf courses, Silverado was the first course he redesigned himself.  In July 2013 it was announced that Silverado would again play host for a PGA tournament starting in October 2014, when it hosted the Frys.com Open.  The renovation added over 300 yards, removed trees and repositioned bunkers. Miller served as the unofficial face of the resort during the event, as he was a part of the telecast, which frequently referenced his role in the club. When he had to fulfill official club duties during the week, Miller's friend and NBC colleague Roger Maltbie filled in for him.

Miller retired from broadcasting following the third round of the 2019 Phoenix Open.

Personal life
Miller is a member of the Church of Jesus Christ of Latter-day Saints. He and his wife Linda have six children and live on the Monterey Peninsula in California and Mount Olympus, Utah. During the 2018 Ryder Cup broadcast, he announced that his 25th grandchild was born. His son Andy won a Buy.com Tour event and played on the PGA Tour.

Professional wins (36)

PGA Tour wins (25)

*Note: The 1974 Bing Crosby National Pro-Am was shortened to 54 holes due to weather.

PGA Tour playoff record (1–5)

Japan Golf Tour wins (1)

Other wins (10)

*Note: The 1983 Chrysler Team Championship was shortened to 54 holes due to rain.

Other playoff record (2–1)

Major championships

Wins (2)

Results timeline

LA = Low amateur
CUT = missed the halfway cut (3rd round cut in 1980 Open Championship)
DQ = disqualified
WD = withdrew
"T" indicates a tie for a place.

Summary

Most consecutive cuts made – 14 (1972 U.S. Open – 1975 Open Championship)
Longest streak of top-10s – 3 (1973 Masters – 1973 Open Championship)

U.S. national team appearances
Professional
Ryder Cup: 1975 (winners), 1981 (winners)
World Cup: 1973 (winners, individual winner), 1975 (winners, individual winner), 1980
Wendy's 3-Tour Challenge (representing Senior PGA Tour): 1997

See also
Spring 1969 PGA Tour Qualifying School graduates
List of golfers with most PGA Tour wins
Longest PGA Tour win streaks
Most PGA Tour wins in a year

References

External links

Golf Magazine – The Critic – June 2007 – p. 112–123
USA Today – NBC's Miller keeps firing away – June 13, 2002

American male golfers
BYU Cougars men's golfers
PGA Tour golfers
Ryder Cup competitors for the United States
Winners of men's major golf championships
World Golf Hall of Fame inductees
Golf course architects
Golf writers and broadcasters
Golfers from San Francisco
American Latter Day Saints
People from Napa, California
1947 births
Living people